Callitriche palustris, the vernal water-starwort, narrow-fruited water-starwort, or spiny water starwort, is a species of aquatic plants. It is the type species of its genus.

References

External links 
 
 
 Callitriche palustris at Tropicos

palustris
Freshwater plants
Plants described in 1753
Taxa named by Carl Linnaeus